Pontville is a rural locality in the local government areas (LGA) of Brighton and Southern Midlands in the Hobart and Central LGA regions of Tasmania. The 2016 census has a population of 623 for the state suburb of Pontville.

History
Pontville was sited by Governor Lachlan Macquarie, in 1821, and was an early garrison town, where convicts built the bridge over the Jordan River. During World Wars I and II the area had a major army camp.
There is an old sandstone bridge in Pontville that lies on the Jordan River.  The bridge is part of the Midland Highway.

A railway line connected the town with Hobart from 1891 until 1947. Additional excursion trains operated from Hobart, bringing riflemen to the nearby range.
Pontville was gazetted as a locality in 1970.

Brighton Post Office opened on 1 June 1832, was renamed Pontville in 1895, and closed in 1973.

Geography
The Jordan River flows through from south-west to south.

Road infrastructure
The Midland Highway (National Route 1) passes through from south to north-west. Route C195 (Brighton Road) starts at an intersection with Route 1 and runs south until it exits.

Immigration detention centre
The Federal Government announced in April 2011 that it would spend $15 million on converting the army rifle range to an asylum-seeker detention centre, housing 400 people, mainly single adult men. Although the 'Pontville Immigration Detention Centre' was also used to house under-age males. In February 2012 it was announced by the Department of Immigration and Citizenship that the centre would be closed, which it did in September 2013.

References 

Towns in Tasmania
Localities of Brighton Council (Tasmania)
Localities of Southern Midlands Council